Catharsius molossus is a species of dung beetle of the family Scarabaeidae.

Description
This species is completely black, the body is short and convex, quite hairy on the ventral side and usually with a short conical horn in the centre of the head of the males. Pronotum is densely granulated and elytra are finely striated. It is used in traditional Chinese medicine for detoxification, swelling and constipation.

Distribution
Catharsius molossus is one of the most widespread and abundant coprophagous species in tropical Asian regions. It occurs in the Palearctic realm (Afghanistan, Nepal, Sikkim, China, Taiwan), and in the Oriental realm (India, Sri Lanka, Andaman Islands, Vietnam, Laos, Cambodia, Thailand, Malaysia, Timor, and Flores).

References

Biolib
Zipcodezoo Species Identifier
Catalogue of Life

External links
Catharsius molossus
Dung Beetle

Scarabaeidae
Beetles described in 1758
Taxa named by Carl Linnaeus